Christian Schumach (born 17 September 1981 in Murau) is an Austrian dressage rider. He represented Austria at the 2014 World Equestrian Games in Normandy, France, where he finished 8th in team dressage and 64th in the individual dressage competition. He also represented Austria at the 2017 FEI European Dressage Championships.

In 2021, he was selected by the Austrian Equestrian Federation (OEPS) to represent Austria at the Olympic Games in Tokyo, he finished 21st in individual dressage.

References

External links
 

Living people
1981 births
Austrian male equestrians
Austrian dressage riders
Equestrians at the 2020 Summer Olympics
Olympic equestrians of Austria
People from Murau
Sportspeople from Styria